John II Palaeologus (5 February 1321 – 19 March 1372) was the Margrave of Montferrat from 1338.

Career
John was the son of Theodore I of Montferrat, with whom he was associated in the government from 1336. He had great fortune in extending the boundaries of the margraviate against his neighbours. With the help of his cousin Otto of Brunswick-Grubenhagen, John turned against the Angevins of Naples, who had large possessions in Piedmont and Savoy. On 9 October 1338, he was named governor of Asti.

In 1343, when Robert, King of Naples died and his young granddaughter Joanna I took the crown, John took the opportunity to expand his control in northern Italy. By 1344, he had conquered Alessandria, Asti, Tortona, Bra and Alba. On 22 April 1345, at the Battle of Gamenario, he defeated the Angevine vicar Reforza d'Angoult, who died in the battle.  With the tacit support of Luchino Visconti, John occupied Alba, Bra, Valenza and, in 1348, Cuneo. His power grew in 1355 when he accompanied the Emperor Charles IV through Italy. At that time he received the cities of Cherasco, Novara and Pavia.

By a marriage to the last titular Queen of Majorca, Isabella, he lost the support of the emperor and had to fend off attacks from imperial and Visconti troops. This conflict concluded with restitution of territory around Pavia occupied by John to the Visconti in exchange for Visconti possessions in the area of Asti. John lost many vassals to the Visconti. In his will of 1372, John left the tutelage of his children to Otto of Brunswick and Amadeus VI of Savoy. He had four sons, three of whom succeeded him in turn, and a daughter with his wife Isabella (Secondotto, John III, Theodore II, Margaret and William). John died at Volpiano near Turin soon after composing his testament and was buried at Chivasso.

Ancestry

References

Sources
 

|-

1321 births
1372 deaths
14th-century Italian nobility
John 2
John 2